The fine-browed dwarf skink (Pygmaeascincus koshlandae) is a species of skink found in Queensland in Australia.

References

Pygmaeascincus
Reptiles described in 1991
Skinks of Australia
Endemic fauna of Australia
Taxa named by Allen Eddy Greer